Dendrolobium is a genus of flowering plants in the legume family, Fabaceae. It belongs to the subfamily Faboideae. The genus included 18 accepted species and 8 unresolved species.

Accepted species
Dendrolobium arbuscula (Domin) Ohashi
Dendrolobium baccatum (Schindl.) Schindl.
Dendrolobium cheelii (C.A.Gardner) Pedley  
Dendrolobium cumingianum Benth.
Dendrolobium dispermum (Hayata) Schindl.  
Dendrolobium geesinkii Ohashi  
Dendrolobium lanceolatum (Dunn) Schindl.  
Dendrolobium olivaceum (Prain) Schindl.  
Dendrolobium papuacola Ohashi & T.Nemoto 
Dendrolobium polyneurum (S.T.Blake) Ohashi  
Dendrolobium quinquepetalum (Blanco) Schindl.  
Dendrolobium rostratum (Schindl.) Schindl. 
Dendrolobium rugosum (Prain) Schindl. 
Dendrolobium stipatum S.T.Blake 
Dendrolobium thorelii (Gagnep.) Schindl. 
Dendrolobium triangulare (Retz.) Schindl.
Dendrolobium umbellatum (L.) Benth. 
Dendrolobium ursinum (Schindl.) Schindl.  
Dendrolobium wenzelii Ame

Unresolved species
Dendrolobium arbuscula (Domin) H. Ohashi  
Dendrolobium cephalotes (Roxb.) Benth.  
Dendrolobium multiflorum Pedley   
Dendrolobium obovatum Schltr.  
Dendrolobium polyneurum (S.T. Blake) H. Ohashi   
Dendrolobium quinquepetalum (Blanco) H. Ohashi   
Dendrolobium strongylanthum Rchb. f.

References

 
Desmodieae
Fabaceae genera